Ingeborg of Norway (Old Norse Ingibjörg Hákonardóttir, Swedish Ingeborg Håkansdotter, Norwegian Ingebjørg Håkonsdatter; 1301 – 17 June 1361), was a Norwegian princess and by marriage a Swedish royal duchess with a position in the regency governments in Norway (1319–27) and Sweden (1319–26) during the minority of her son, King Magnus of Norway and Sweden. In 1318–1319, she was Sweden's de facto ruler, and from 1319 until 1326, she was Sweden's first de jure female regent. Her role in northern European history is considered of major importance.

Life

Early life
Ingeborg was born in 1301 as the only legitimate daughter of King Håkon V of Norway from his marriage with Euphemia of Rügen. As a child, she was first betrothed to Magnus Birgerson, the son and designated heir of Birger, King of Sweden. Soon afterwards the engagement was however broken for altered political reasons, and in 1305 she was betrothed to Eric, Duke of Södermanland, a younger brother of King Birger, thus uncle of her first betrothed. In 1312, Ingeborg and Eric were formally married in a double wedding in Oslo; at the same time, her namesake cousin Ingeborg married Eric's brother duke Valdemar Magnusson. At her wedding, her mother Queen Euphemia had published the recently translated (by her command) famous poems, the Euphemia songs. The couple had two children before Duke Eric was murdered.

Leader of the Ducal party
Upon the imprisonment of her spouse and her brother-in-law, she and her cousin and sister-in-law, Ingeborg Eriksdottir, became the leaders of their spouses' followers. On 16 April 1318, the two duchesses Ingeborg made a treaty in Kalmar with the Danish duke Christoffer of Halland-Samsö and archbishop Esgar of Lund to free their husbands and not to make peace with the kings of Sweden and Denmark before they agreed to this, and the two duchesses promised to honor the promises they gave in return in the names of their husbands. Later the same year, their husbands were confirmed to have died.

Regency

Her son Magnus VII of Norway, at the age of 3, was proclaimed king of Norway upon her father's death, in rights devolved from her. Ingeborg was recognized as formal regent of her son in Norway. Soon, the Swedish nobility elected young Magnus king of Sweden after deposing Birger, and Ingeborg was made nominal regent of Sweden and given a seat and vote in the Swedish government and the title: Ingeborg, by the Grace of God, daughter of Haakon, duchess in the Kingdom of Sweden. Duchess Ingeborg held her own court at her residence in Varberg. Letters 1318-1321 reveal that powerful Swedish men took advantage of the young dowager duchess by having her issue, alone and over her own seal, documents to their advantage as compensation for their support of the murdered dukes Eric and Waldemar and of little Magnus's right to the throne.

The exact position of Ingeborg in the regency council is hard to define properly due to the documentation. Mats Kettilumndsson, her ally, presided over the Swedish regency council "alongside" the two "duchesses Ingeborg"; Ingeborg Håkansdotter and her cousin and sister-in-law Ingeborg Eriksdottir. Magnus, already King of Norway, was elected King of Sweden with the approval of the Norwegian council in her presence. Ingeborg was the only one with a seat in both the Swedish and the Norwegian minor regency and council of state. She was duchess of her own fiefs, which were autonomous under her rule, and a large number of castles which controlled big areas thanks to their strategic positions.

"Ingeborg's position at court was not well-defined: she was the king's mother (Kongemor), but without being a dowager queen."

Favourites
She was criticized for her way of conducting her own politics without the counsel of the Swedish and Norwegian councils, and for using the royal seal of her son for her own wishes.
1 October 1320, she liberated Riga from its debts in her name on behalf of her son. She was known to make large donations to her supporters. Canute Porse had been one of the supporters of her spouse and was appointed governor of Varberg. Ingeborg surrounded herself with young foreign men, thought to affect her politics, of which Canute was the most known. 12 April 1321, the Swedish council, after receiving complaints from the Norwegian council regarding a rumour of crimes and disturbances in Ingeborg's lands made by foreigners, told the Norwegian council to advise Ingeborg to listen more to the advice of the old experienced men in the councils rather than to young inexperienced foreign men; a law was created which banned foreigners in the Swedish council.

The Scania affair
Ingeborg and Canute had the ambition to make the then Danish Scania a part of her possessions. In 1321, Ingeborg arranged a marriage with her daughter Euphemia and Albert II, Duke of Mecklenburg. The marriage was arranged with the terms that Mecklenburg, Saxony, Holstein, Rendsburg and Schleswig would assist Ingeborg in the conquest of Scania. This was approved by the council of Norway but not Sweden. To finance the invasion, Ingeborg took a loan from Stralsund with free trade in Sweden and Norway as security. When Ingeborg's forces under command of Canute invaded Scania in 1322–23, Mecklenburg betrayed her to Denmark and the alliance was broken.

Conflict with the councils and diminished power
In 1322, open conflict broke out between Ingeborg and the Swedish regency council; the council of state made an agreement that no order from Ingeborg should hereby be accepted without the approval from the entire council, and all agreements made with her by individual councillors was hereby annulled. In 1323, Ingeborg was forced to accept the terms and give up several of her strategical castles and fiefs.

20 February 1323, also the Norwegian regency council rebelled against Ingeborg. She was accused of misusing the royal seal, to have broken the peace with Denmark and for greater costs, and was replaced as head of the regency. After 1323, Ingeborgs power was limited to what was approved by votes in the councils, which in practice had deposed her. 14 February 1326, in exchange for having her debts paid, Ingeborg gave up several fiefs and was forced to send Canute into exile and was stripped from all political authority in the Swedish regency council. In the Norwegian regency council, however, her signature was still needed in the peace treaty between Norway and Sönderjylland 14 June 1327.

Ingeborg married her lover Canute Porse (d. 1330), a noble from less than royal circles, in 1327. While Canute was allowed to become Duke of Halland and holder of Ingeborg's inherited estates, her marriage was another reason why Swedes, and also increasingly Norwegians, did not allow Ingeborg to use her governmental power in these kingdoms. The year of her second marriage, Ingeborg was stripped from her power also in the Norwegian regency council.

Later life
Her husband was made Duke of Estonia in 1329. In 1330, she again became a widow. Her younger sons became dukes of Halland. Her eldest son became an adult in 1332, and the same year, Ingeborg secured Swedish  superiority (until 1360) over Scania. After the death of her second husband, Ingeborg again took an important position in the life of her son the king, but it is not known how much influence she had on him.

In 1336, Ingeborg welcomed her daughter Euphemia and her son-in-law Albert of Mecklenburg, Rudolf I, Duke of Saxe-Wittenberg and Henry of Holstein with her own fleet to the coronation of her son and his wife in Stockholm. In 1341, Ingeborg and the counts Henry and Claus of Holstein went to war against Valdemar of Schleswig, John of Holstein and the Hanseatic league in Denmark. Ingeborg was residing at Kalundborg in Denmark at the time and was attacked by King Valdemar IV there; after two years of alternating conflicts and agreements the matter was settled against King Valdemar, who however regained Copenhagen Castle.  King Magnus sealed the peace by telling Valdemar to keep the promise he had made to Ingeborg in the peace treaty. In 1350, she inherited the title and position of Duke of Halland from her younger son.

Children and family
With Eric, Duke of Södermanland, Ingeborg had two children:

 Magnus VII of Norway (1316–1374)
 Euphemia of Sweden, duchess of Mecklenburg (1317–c. 1370)

With Canute Porse, Duke of Halland and Estonia, Ingeborg had three children:

 Haakon, Duke of Halland, died 1350
 Canute, Duke of Halland, died 1350
 Bridget, married Jon Hafthorsson and had issue

Legacy
Along with Swedish-Italian Saint Bridget and reigning Queen Margaret of Scandinavia, Ingeborg has been called one of the three most extraordinary Scandinavian historical women in European history.

The controversy around Ingeborg's second marriage and the potential succession of her son Haakon to the Norwegian throne are an important part of the plot of the novel Kristin Lavransdatter by Sigrid Undset.

References

Further reading
Den svenska historien. Medeltid 1319-1520 (Stockholm:Bonniers 1966), s. 14-18

 Jerker Rosén : Den svenska historien 2. Medeltiden 1319-1520 (1966)
 Nationalencyklopedin, Bokförlaget Bra Böcker AB, Höganäs (1992)
 

14th-century women rulers
Norwegian princesses
Ingiburga 1312
1301 births
1361 deaths
Disinherited European royalty
Regents of Norway
Regents of Sweden
House of Sverre
House of Bjelbo
14th-century Norwegian people
14th-century Swedish people
14th-century Norwegian women
14th-century Swedish women
Daughters of kings